Zhao Jun (born November 1954) is a Chinese ambassador, currently serving in Norway.

Biography
Zhao, a university graduate, started off as a staff member at the Embassy of the People's Republic of China in Malta.
In 1981 he became a staff member, Attache and Third Secretary, Department of West European Affairs, and Ministry of Foreign Affairs of the People's Republic of China. In 1992, he served as the deputy director of the Department of West European Affairs. Between 1996 and 2001 he was a counselor at the Chinese Embassy in the United Kingdom and in Northern Ireland. In 2007 he replaced Chen Yonglong as Chinese Ambassador to Israel and was relieved from that position in 2011, succeeded by Gao Yanping.

He's now the ambassador to Norway. Zhao is married and has one son.

References list

External links
 Headed The tennis table teams headed by Ambassador Zhao Jun
 His remarks on Israel

Ambassadors of China to Israel
Ambassadors of China to Norway
1954 births
Living people